Brian Carbee is a US born, Australian resident scriptwriter of Accidents Happen, the first feature film of Andrew Lancaster, for whom he also wrote and choreographed the multi-award-winning short film In Search of Mike.  Carbee has been a dancer and choreographer for various companies including Limbs, Douglas Wright Dance, Chunky Move and his own company Jump Giants.  He won a 2005 Australian Dance Award for best choreography for In the Dark, directed by Wendy Houstoun, and won a Special Festival Award for his production of Stretching It Wider at the 2001 Mardi Gras Gay and Lesbian Arts Festival. He is a contemporary dance teacher of note currently based in Sydney, Australia.

Filmography

References

Australian screenwriters
Australian choreographers
Living people
Year of birth missing (living people)